Emily Gap / Anthwerrke is a natural attraction and significant cultural site in the East MacDonnell Ranges, eight kilometres to the east of Mparntwe/Alice Springs, in Australia's Northern Territory.

History 
Adjacent to Jessie Gap, Emily Gap is a significant site for the dreaming stories of three ancestral caterpillars, Yeperenye, Utnerrengatye and the Ntyarlke. The caterpillar dreaming is one of the most important creation stories for Mparntwe/Alice Springs and the surrounding region. Many Arrernte people conceived in Alice Springs consider themselves direct descendants of these caterpillars.

Emily and Jessie Gaps are apocryphally thought to have been named for the daughters of Charles Todd, however the true basis of the names remain unknown.

Geology 
Around 300-350 million years ago a mountain building event created the MacDonnell Ranges. Since that time, folding, faulting and erosion have shaped the range and created numerous gaps and gorges, of which Emily Gap is one. The ranges are composed of many rock types, but are most famous for their red quartzite peaks and gorges. Other rock types include granite, limestone, sandstone and siltstone. Some of the valleys of the range contain fossil evidence of the inland sea that once covered central Australia.

References 

Canyons and gorges in the Northern Territory
Tourist attractions in Alice Springs